Laudit Mavugo (born 10 October 1993) is a Burundian footballer who plays for Napsa Stars FC which is playing in the Zambian Premier League. He is a member of Burundi national football team. He plays as a forward.

International career

International goals
Scores and results list Burundi's goal tally first.

References

External links 
 

1989 births
Living people
Burundian footballers
Burundi international footballers
Association football forwards
Muzinga FC players
2019 Africa Cup of Nations players
21st-century Burundian people